Sara Errani and Roberta Vinci were the defending champions but decided not to participate.
In the final Renata Voráčová and Barbora Záhlavová-Strýcová defeated Darija Jurak and Katalin Marosi 7–6(7–5), 6–4.

Seeds

Draw

Draw

References
 Main Draw

Internazionali Femminili di Palermo - Doubles
2012 Doubles